Fertilisers and Chemicals Travancore Ground or FACT Stadium is a multi purpose stadium in Eloor, Kochi in the state of Kerala. The ground is owned and managed by Fertilisers and Chemicals Travancore. The ground is mainly used for organizing matches of football, cricket and other sports. The stadium has hosted two Ranji Trophy match  in 1965 when Kerala cricket team played against Andhra cricket team. The ground has one more Ranji Trophy matches again in 1965 when Kerala cricket team played against Hyderabad cricket team and against in 1992 but since then the stadium has hosted non-first-class matches.

See also 

 Fertilisers and Chemicals Travancore
 Eloor

References

External links 

 cricketarchive
 cricinfo
 Wikimapia
 FAC 

Football venues in Kerala
Defunct cricket grounds in India
Sports venues completed in 1965
1965 establishments in Kerala
Sports venues in Kochi
20th-century architecture in India